André Lebrun (1 August 1927 – 8 March 2021) was a French middle-distance runner. He competed in the men's 3000 metres steeplechase at the 1952 Summer Olympics.

References

1927 births
1996 deaths
Athletes (track and field) at the 1952 Summer Olympics
French male middle-distance runners
French male steeplechase runners
Olympic athletes of France
Place of birth missing